This is a list of members of the 4th Legislative Assembly of Queensland from 1868 to 1870, as elected at the 1868 colonial elections held between 14 September 1868 and 6 October 1868 (due to problems of distance and communications, it was not possible to hold the elections on a single day).

See also
Premier:
 Robert Mackenzie (1867–1868)
 Charles Lilley (1868–1870)

Notes
 On 11 December 1868, John Douglas, member for East Moreton, resigned. Henry Jordan won the resulting by-election on 23 December 1868.
 On 29 January 1869, Robert Travers Atkin, member for Clermont, resigned. Oscar de Satge won the resulting by-election on 4 March 1869.
 On 30 January 1869, Theophilus Parsons Pugh, member for Town of Brisbane, resigned. George Edmondstone was elected unopposed at the resulting by-election on 10 February 1869.
 On 6 April 1869, Robert Mackenzie, former Premier and member for Burnett, retired from politics and departed for Europe. Charles Haly won the resulting by-election on 21 April 1869.
 On 11 June 1869, Thomas Henry FitzGerald, member for Kennedy, resigned. Rt Hon John Bright, an English Radical politician who was endorsed as a form of protest, won the resulting by-election on 10 July 1869. He never took his seat in the Queensland Parliament.
 On 19 November 1869, Archibald Archer, member for Rockhampton, resigned. Henry Milford won the resulting by-election on 6 December 1869, although did not take his seat.
 On 23 November 1869, Arthur Hodgson, the member for Warrego, resigned. Thomas McIlwraith won the resulting by-election on 5 January 1870.
 On 3 December 1869, Edward Lamb, member for Mitchell, resigned. Archibald Berdmore Buchanan won the resulting by-election on 8 February 1870; however, it emerged he had not nominated as a candidate and had been elected against his own wishes, and he resigned two days later.
 On 17 February 1870, Arthur Francis, member for East Moreton, resigned due to insolvency. After Robert Cribb withdrew his nomination, Robert Travers Atkin was elected unopposed on 17 February 1870.
 On 4 April 1870, Oscar de Satge, member for the Clermont resigned. John Robinson Benson won the resulting by-election on 4 May 1870. 
 On 7 June 1870, Henry Milford, member for Rockhampton since a December 1869 by-election, resigned. He stood again at the resulting by-election on 20 June 1870, but was defeated by Alexander Fyfe.
 On 13 June 1870, Samuel Hodgson, member for West Moreton, resigned. John Ferrett won the resulting by-election on 25 June 1870.

References

 Waterson, Duncan Bruce: Biographical Register of the Queensland Parliament 1860-1929 (second edition), Sydney 2001.
 Alphabetical Register of Members (Queensland Parliament)

Members of Queensland parliaments by term
19th-century Australian politicians